The 1980 World Judo Championships were the first edition of the Women's World Judo Championships, and were held in New York City, United States from 29 to 30 November 1980.

Medal overview

Women

Medal table

References

External links
results of WC 1980 in New York on judoinside.com retrieved December 11, 2013
page of WC-results in the Judo Encyclopedia by T. Plavecz retrieved December 11, 2013

World Championships
J
World Judo Championships
J
World Judo Championships
Sports competitions in New York City
International sports competitions in New York (state)